Orbital Exploration Technologies, Inc., also known as Orbital Exploration or OrbitX, is a Philippine aerospace and space transportation company.

History
OrbitX was established on June 2, 2019 as OrbX, a private venture by a group of youth including Dexter Baño Jr., Enzo Victor, and Paulo Sairel. OrbitX's short term goal is to develop the first indigenous reusable rocket, and the long-term goal is to send the first Filipino to Mars and back. OrbitX is known as the Philippines' first commercial spaceflight company.

Its first flagship project is the Haribon SLS-1 launch vehicle. OrbitX started a crowdfunding campaign which received support from Southeast Asian firm and Genix Ventures and other private individuals. It also received a two-year funding of $6,500 for research purposes from the Amazon Web Services.

Projects

Haribon SLS-1

OrbitX is developing its own space launch vehicle which it dubs as the Haribon SLS-1. It is to be propelled using components also to be developed by OrbitX: Tamaraw Rocket Engine and RP-2 fuel, a plastic-derived fuel. RP-2 gets its named from RP-1, the refined kerosene that is typically used in rockets. As of January 2021, the project is in the Technology Readiness Level 4 phase of development with its components still being validated in a laboratory environment. It is projected to carry a payload of  into low Earth orbit. The company plans to have the maiden launch of the Haribon SLS-1 sometime between 2023 and 2024.

Fuels
Among OrbitX's research is the potential use of algae as biofuel for both small and large-scale space launch vehicles. The company has noted that algae-derived biofuel has already had prior used on aircraft; particularly in a Houston–Chicago Boeing 737 flight. It is also developing, OrbitX RP-2, its own propriety fuel derived from pyrolysis-processed waste plastic.

Orbital Coin (ORBX) 
On February 10, 2021, OrbitX teased about their in-house cryptocurrency. On February 12, 2021, OrbitX announced the cryptocurrency named Orbital Coin or ORBX, as they'll also fund the rocket using their in-house cryptocurrency.

On July 5, 2021, OrbitX announced their initial coin offering, as scheduled on July 20. ORBX was developed by ProofSys.io and OrbitX.

Cooperation
OrbitX relays its findings and developments to the Philippine Space Agency (PhilSA), the national space agency of the Philippine government, although OrbitX itself is a private venture and is independent from PhilSA. It also has partnerships and affiliations with the Space4Impact and Space Impulse, the Green Party of the Philippines, the Polytechnic University of the Philippines, and the government's Department of Environment and Natural Resources.

References

2019 establishments in the Philippines
Aerospace companies of the Philippines
Private spaceflight companies
Spacecraft manufacturers
Biofuel producers
Algal fuel producers
Science and technology in the Philippines
Companies based in Quezon City
Crowdfunding projects